Pottery of Sri Lanka is one of the traditional small industries. The pottery industry is distributed almost throughout the country and it has a long history and a tradition.

History 
The pottery of Sri Lanka has a very long history. There are pieces of evidence about the history of pottery in Sri Lanka that goes back to the second century BC.  It has become unbroken tradition that was passed from one generation to other. There is evidence from the archeological excavations at the Anuradhapura Gedige and Kandarodai in Jaffna that has found pottery items in the early stage of history in Sri Lanka. the archeological excavations done near the Thissamaharamaya found many pottery items dated back to second BC. Some of them were imported from various places in the world. That proves pottery items were one of the main good which was traded in international trading in ancient Sri Lanka.

Main materials 
The main material that is used in Sri Lankan pottery industry is clay. There are main three types of clay that are used for pottery. As a result of the large scale of use, clay has become a scarce resource in Sri Lanka. Mainly clay is available in the areas of Nattandiya, Dediyawela, Boralasgamuwa, and Meetiyagoda. Most of the traditional pottery villages are found near these clay deposits. But Since the demand spreads in all the country there can be found other villages also outside these clay deposits. Therefore, some potters find it difficult to obtain clay which increases the production cost.

Red clay 
Red clay is commonly available in Sri Lanka. It is usually mixed with sands and grit. This type of clay is mainly used to make tile and bricks. But after clearing from the dirt it is also used for pottery.

White clay 
White clay is found as a large deposit. It can not be used as raw material directly and needs to be mixed with other materials to use in the pottery industry. Most of the time white clay is used to manufacture porcelain and ceramics.

Ball clay 
Ball clay can be found in small deposits. the main component of the ball clay is Kaolin. Boralesgamuwa and Mitiyagoda areas are the main areas with large Ball clay deposits.

Main techniques 
The techniques that are used by most potters have not been changed for a long time. Materials are prepared by thoroughly mixing red clay and black clay. Then the mixture is heaped and kept aside for about a month for seasoning. Then the broken heap is sliced by using a sliver of bamboo. The purpose of this is to remove dust and dirt. Then it is kneaded and trample with adding adequate water. Then it is kept for another day.

The traditional potters' wheel is called 'Sakaporuwa' (සක පෝරුව). It is a wheel around 2.5 feet in diameter. it is flexible to rotate and fixed firmly to the ground. The traditional wheel was turned by the potters' wife or a child while the potter was making the pot. But currently, most of the potters' wheels are driven by electric motors. While the wheel is turning potters puts a ball of clay at the center of the wheel and moulds the pot with both hands. He makes the shape and the mouth of the pot using the wheel. Then the pot is cut and taken out by using a small spoke. The ring of the pot is made using a piece of cloth or rubber tubing. Then the shaping and trimming are done. The bottom of the pot is not finished yet. Before that, the pot is kept for another day to dry. Then the potter takes the pot to his left hand and 'Walantalana Lalla' (වලං තලන ලෑල්ල) or 'Mati Aluwa' (මැටි අලුව) to his right hand which is a bat-shaped wooden tool. Then he holds a round stone inside the pot near the bottom and shapes the bottom by patting it with the Walantalana Lalla. Then the pot is rubbed smoothly and any decoration is added.

The kiln is used to burn pots to the required temperature. It is a square-shaped enclosure that is built to stack pots and burn. The firing is done by the potter himself. The materials that commonly available are used as fuel for firing. The most common fuel materials are coconut husks and coconut woods. There are few opens in the kiln to escape the smoke. Pots are stacked inside the kiln and first, it is smoked for around two days. This process is called 'Dun gahanawa' (දුං ගහනවා). Then gradually the temperature is increased and the pots are burnt for another one day. This needs the experience to make sure pots are burnt adequately. Otherwise many pots break when they are taken out from the kiln. After that, it is kept to reduce the temperature dramatically for about two days. Then the kiln is broken and the pots are taken out.

This is the traditional process of making a pot. There are some new techniques added. But still, most of the potters make their pots in a traditional way in Sri Lanka.

Current status and new developments of the industry 
Considering the current SME sector in Sri Lanka traditional pottery industry faces many challenges such as material scarcity and inadequate affordability. This sector still generates a low profit. Therefore, many people who are involved in the pottery industry face many socio and economic problems. Lack of modern technology, the inefficiency of production, and the high rate of damages are some of the major problems they face.

In 2020 newly elected government under the leadership of president Gotabaya Rajapaksa made a new approach to develop traditional industries including pottery. As an initiative new state ministry was formed as 'Clay, Cane, Brass, Furniture, and Rural Industry Promotion state ministry'. Under this ministry, it is expected to identify the problems in traditional industries and develop them as SMEs by giving short term and long-term solutions.

References 

Sri Lanka
Sri Lankan culture